Lead(II) thiocyanate is a compound, more precisely a salt, with the formula Pb(SCN)2. It is a white crystalline solid, but will turn yellow upon exposure to light. It is slightly soluble in water and can be converted to a basic salt (Pb(CNS)2·Pb(OH)2 when boiled. Salt crystals may form upon cooling. Lead thiocyanate can cause lead poisoning if ingested and can adversely react with many substances. It has use in small explosives, matches, and dyeing. 

Lead(II) thiocyanate is reasonably soluble at room temperature, thus it may be difficult to identify in a solution with low concentration of lead(II) thiocyanate. Although it has not been confirmed by other sources than the author of this article, experiments show that even if there is no precipitation of lead(II) thiocyanate in the solution, crystals of the salt may form.

Synthesis 
Lead(II) thiocyanate can be formed from the acidification of lead(II) nitrate, Pb(NO3)2, with nitric acid, HNO3, in the presence of thiocyanic acid, HSCN. It may also be made by reacting lead(II) acetate (Pb(CH3COO)2) solved in water with either potassium thiocyanate (KSCN) or ammonium thiocyanate (NH4SCN), thus causing a white precipitation of solid lead(II) thiocyanate according to the ion reaction:

Pb2+(aq) + 2SCN−(aq) → Pb(SCN)2(s)

Reactivity 
When exposed to UV or visible light lead thiocyanate will turn yellow due to the presence of sulfur. It is violently oxidized by nitric acid and will releases hydrogen cyanide gas after contact with acid, which is toxic. High amounts of heat such as that produces in a house fire will releases sulfur dioxide gas, also toxic. Like other metal cyanides, Lead thiocyanate explodes on heating when mixed with sodium nitrite.

Health hazards 
Skin and eye irritant, can induce lead poisoning by ingestion or inhalation.

Symptoms include gastrointestinal disorders, irritation of digestive tract, leg cramps, muscle weakness, paresthesia. High doses can result in coma or death. Symptoms present in 1 to 2 days.

Lead poisoning 
Most lead(II) salts have a sweet taste making them a hazard for continued consumption small children. While lead thiocyanate was likely not used in paints due to its light sensitivity, many lead based paints have been used pre-1970s. The paint has a tendency to peel and fall off making it likely to expose small children and pets.

Since lead poisoning occurs with the binding of lead(II) to biological systems, research has been done to find ligands that more preferentially bind to lead(II) than other biological targets in an effort to combat the effects of lead poisoning.

Uses 
Lead thiocyanate is used in explosives, specifically an ingredient in primers for small-arms cartridges, safety matches, and to reverse aniline black dyeing (Gideon). It can also be used as a precursor for preparing perovskite solar cells.

See also
 Lead

References

External links
 Source for other names and health hazards

Thiocyanates
Lead(II) compounds